George A. Howe    was a Massachusetts  politician who served as the second Mayor of Marlborough, Massachusetts.

Career 
Howe served as a member of the Marlborough Board of Alderman in 1892. He also served as a member of the Marlborough Board of Selectmen. 

In 1892, he succeeded Simon Herbert Howe as the second Mayor of Marlborough, Massachusetts.

Death
Howe died on November 7, 1909.

Notes

Mayors of Marlborough, Massachusetts
1909 deaths
Massachusetts Republicans
Massachusetts city council members
Year of birth missing